Porte d'Auteuil is a métro station serving Line 10 (westbound only). It is situated in the 16th arrondissement.

History 
The station opened on 30 September 1913 as part of the extension of line 8 from Beaugrenelle (now Charles Michels). On 29 July 1937, line 10 was extended from Duroc to La Motte-Picquet - Grenelle and the section of line 8 between La Motte-Picquet - Grenelle and Porte d'Auteuil, including Porte d'Auteuil was transferred to line 10. Prior to 3 October 1980, when the line was extended to Boulogne - Jean Jaurès, trains ran on to Michel-Ange - Molitor to return to the east. The station is named after the Porte d'Auteuil, a gate in the nineteenth century Thiers wall of Paris, which was located in the district of Auteuil, which was mostly incorporated in the 16th arrondissement in 1860, with the remainder absorbed into the commune of Boulogne-Billancourt.

Station layout

Tourism 
 Stade Roland Garros, home to the French Open tennis tournament.
 Parc des Princes
 Stade Jean-Bouin
 Jardin des Serres d'Auteuil
 Auteuil Hippodrome
 Bois de Boulogne

Gallery

References
Roland, Gérard (2003). Stations de métro. D’Abbesses à Wagram. Éditions Bonneton.

Paris Métro stations in the 16th arrondissement of Paris
Railway stations in France opened in 1913